Carrega Ligure is a comune (municipality) in the Province of Alessandria in the Italian region Piedmont, located about  southeast of Turin and about  southeast of Alessandria, in the upper Ligurian Apennines in the Val Borbera.

Carrega Ligure borders the following municipalities: Cabella Ligure, Fascia, Gorreto, Mongiardino Ligure, Ottone, Propata, Valbrevenna, and Vobbia.

References

Cities and towns in Piedmont